Gerald Michael "Cheesie" Cheevers (born 7 December 1940) is a Canadian former professional ice hockey goaltender who played in the National Hockey League (NHL) and World Hockey Association (WHA) between 1961 and 1980. Cheevers is best known for his two stints with the Boston Bruins, whom he helped win the Stanley Cup in 1970 and 1972. He was inducted into the Hockey Hall of Fame in 1985.

He was the first to decorate his goaltender mask with stitch markings where a puck had struck, leading to the contemporary tradition of goaltenders decorating their masks with distinctive visual stylings.

Playing career
Cheevers's hockey career began in 1956 at the age of 16 when he played for the St. Michael's Majors of the Ontario Hockey Association.

The right to sign him to an NHL contract was held by the Toronto Maple Leafs (with whom he played two games) until the Boston Bruins drafted him in 1965. In the 1964–65 season he won 48 games in leading the Rochester Americans to their first Calder Cup championship, becoming the final goaltender in league history to play every game (coincidentally, he did this one season after his future Bruins teammate Eddie Johnston was the final goaltender to do so in the NHL). Cheevers still holds the AHL record for most victories in a season by a goaltender.

He was claimed that offseason by the Boston Bruins in the Intra-League Draft, and saw his first action with the Bruins in the 1966 season, although he spent the bulk of the next two years with the Bruins' farm club, the Oklahoma City Blazers of the Central Professional Hockey League.

With the six team expansion in 1967, and the Bruins losing goaltenders Bernie Parent and Doug Favell to the expansion Philadelphia Flyers, Cheevers became the number one goaltender in Boston for the next five seasons.

He was a member of both the 1970 and 1972 Stanley Cup winning teams, gaining a reputation as a driven, "money" goaltender. Cheevers held the Boston Bruins' record for most playoff wins by a goaltender (with 53) until it was surpassed by Tuukka Rask in 2021.  Cheevers had held the record since 1977 when he surpassed Frank Brimsek's mark of 32.

In 1972, he went undefeated in 32 consecutive games, a NHL record that still stands.

In the fall of 1972, he jumped to the fledgling World Hockey Association, where he played three and a half seasons for the Cleveland Crusaders. He made the First All-Star Team in 1973 and Second All-Star Team in 1974 and 1975. In 1974, he played seven of the eight games for Team Canada in the 1974 Summit Series.

Cheevers returned to the Bruins during the 1975–76 season after a financial dispute with the Crusaders' management. In the 1979–80 season Cheevers and Gilles Gilbert were runners-up for the Vezina Trophy, which was won by Don Edwards and Bob Sauvé of the Buffalo Sabres. He retired at the end of that season.

Cheevers had a career NHL goals against average of 2.89, recorded 230 NHL wins, played in 419 NHL games, and registered 26 NHL shutouts. He is second in the WHA's history in career GAA and shutouts, even though he played during only half the league's existence. If one combines both their NHL and WHA statistics, Gerry Cheevers (329), Mike Liut (325), and Bernie Parent (304) all would have at least 300 wins. Cheevers was inducted into the Hockey Hall of Fame in 1985, and is one of the few goaltenders in the Hall to have never been named to the All-Star Team or won the Vezina Trophy.

Style
Cheevers was not afraid to stray from the crease to cut down the shooter's angle or to act as a "third defenseman". He was very aggressive with opposing players who strayed into or near the crease, and was not afraid to hit opposing players with his goalie stick if they got too close to the crease.

Not a "stand-up" goalie, Cheevers could often be found on his knees or even his side. He perfected this "flopping" style while playing for Rochester during the 1962–63 season. Americans' coach Rudy Migay had Cheevers practice without his stick, thus requiring him to rely more on using his body and his pads.

Mask
Cheevers was inspired to create his distinctive stitch-pattern mask when a puck hit him in the face during practice. Cheevers, never one to miss an opportunity to skip out of practice, went to the dressing room. Bruins coach Harry Sinden followed him to the dressing room, where he found Cheevers enjoying a beer and smoking a cigarette. Annoyed, Sinden ordered Cheevers, who wasn't injured, to get back on the ice. In jest, John "Frosty" Forristall, the Bruins' assistant trainer, drew a stitch mark on his mask, which amused the team. After that, any time he was similarly struck, he had a new stitch-mark drawn on his mask. Cheevers later claimed that the mask spared him from over 150 medical stitches over his career and was the first to be custom decorated in the sport. The mask became one of the most recognized of the era, and the original is now on the wall of his grandson's bedroom.

Years later, goalie Steve Shields paid tribute to Cheevers when he played for the Bruins in 2002 and 2003, sporting a modern airbrushed version of the stitch-covered mask. In 2008, The Hockey News rated his mask the greatest ever by a wide margin. It received 221 of possible 300 points; Gilles Gratton's mask was rated second with 66.

Cheevers's mask design has appeared in rock-n-roll culture. Black Veil Brides' lead singer Andy Biersack cited it as the reason he got interested in hockey and played goalie when he was younger. In homage to Cheevers, Biersack painted stitches on his face for live shows.

Publications
In 1971, Cheevers published the book Goaltender, detailing his experiences during the 1970–71 season, through to the unexpected loss in the first round to the underdog Montreal Canadiens.

Coaching career
Cheevers's final season as a player came in 1980, when popular coach Don Cherry was replaced by Fred Creighton. After winning their division in seven of the previous nine seasons, the Bruins were in third place late in the year, and general manager Harry Sinden fired Creighton and took over as coach for the remainder of the season. For the 1980–81 season, Cheevers was named coach. In that year's playoffs the Bruins suffered a shocking sweep by the Minnesota North Stars, who had never before won a game in Boston Garden. Even so, Sinden stuck with Cheevers, who led the Bruins to two first-place and two second-place finishes in their division over the next three years. He led the team to the league's best record in the 1982–83 season; in the playoffs the team fell to the eventual Stanley Cup champions, the New York Islanders, in the semifinals.

Cheevers was replaced by Sinden in the middle of the 1984–85 season. With a record of 204–126–46, he ranks seventh in career winning percentage (.604) among NHL coaches with more than 250 games experience.

Retirement
After his departure as Bruins' coach, Cheevers served as a color commentator for the Hartford Whalers from 1986 to 1995 and the Boston Bruins from 1999 to 2002. From 1995 to 2006 he was a member of the Bruins' scouting staff. Cheevers has also devoted time to Thoroughbred racing. His most successful runner was the Grade 1 winner Royal Ski. Cheevers frequently made allusions to horse racing during interviews. After playing a particularly good game in the 1972 Stanley Cup playoffs, Cheevers told reporters he "felt like Riva Ridge"—the horse that had recently won the 1972 Kentucky Derby.

Cheevers lives in Everett, Massachusetts.

Popular culture
In 1996, Canadian pop-punk band Chixdiggit released their self-titled album on SubPop, and included the song "I Feel Like Gerry Cheevers (Stitchmarks On My Heart)." The lyrics include references to Cheevers' undefeated streak, the stitch marks drawn for every shot that hit his cheek, and his number 30 jersey. The chorus includes the lyrics "he wore a mask just like my heart, it had stitch marks on every part."

Awards
 1964–65 – Harry "Hap" Holmes Memorial Award, which goes to the AHL goalie with the best goals against average
 Played in the 1969 NHL All-Star Game
 1972–73 – WHA First Team All-Star, won Ben Hatskin Award for best goaltender
 1973–74 – World Hockey Association Second Team All-Star
 1974–75 – World Hockey Association Second Team All-Star
 1979–80 – Runner-up for the NHL's Vezina Trophy (Lowest goals-against average at the time)
 Inducted into the Hockey Hall of Fame in 1985
 Inducted into the Rochester Americans Hall of Fame in 1987
 Inducted as an inaugural member into the World Hockey Association Hall of Fame in 2010

International play
 1974 – Played for Team Canada at the 1974 Summit Series
 1976 – Spare goaltender for Team Canada in the Canada Cup
 1979 – Played for NHL All Stars in the Challenge Cup vs. Team Soviet Union

Career statistics

Regular season and playoffs

International

* Stanley Cup Champion.

Coaching statistics

References

External links
 

1940 births
Living people
Boston Bruins coaches
Boston Bruins players
Boston Bruins scouts
Boston Bruins announcers
Canadian ice hockey coaches
Canadian ice hockey goaltenders
Cleveland Crusaders players
Hartford Whalers announcers
Hockey Hall of Fame inductees
Ice hockey people from Ontario
National Hockey League broadcasters
Pittsburgh Hornets players
Rochester Americans players
Sault Thunderbirds players
Sportspeople from St. Catharines
Stanley Cup champions
Toronto Maple Leafs players
Toronto St. Michael's Majors players
World Hockey Association broadcasters
Canadian racehorse owners and breeders